Eli Dawe (November 15, 1843 – June 1930) was a merchant and politician in Newfoundland. He represented Harbour Grace in the Newfoundland and Labrador House of Assembly from 1889 to 1909 as a Liberal.

He was born in Port de Grave, the son of the son of Eli Dawe and Emma batten, and educated in Bay Roberts and Coley's Point. Dawe worked as a fisherman, later becoming director of a coal company at Coley's Point. He married Susannah Bradbury in 1873. He served in the Executive Council as financial secretary, chairman of the Board of Works and Minister of Agriculture and Mines. Dawe was named to the Legislative Council of Newfoundland in 1922.

References 

Members of the Newfoundland and Labrador House of Assembly
Members of the Legislative Council of Newfoundland
1843 births
1930 deaths
Government ministers of the Dominion of Newfoundland
Newfoundland Colony people